The Diana Fortress is a Roman castrum built in 100-101 AD, located in Kladovo, in eastern Serbia.

It is located on cliffs of the Đerdap, above the Danube, in the Karataš archaeological site near Kladovo. The main buildings were built on a strategic location overlooking the Danube frontier with stone in 100 AD during the reign of Roman Emperor Trajan, who had a military camp located at the vicinity. Further modifications were made at the end of the 3rd and beginning of the 4th century when additional towers were added towards the river for extra defence towards the Danube shores. At the mid 4th century the fort was damaged by the invading Huns and in 530 AD rebuilt by Emperor Justinian.

Findings & Recognitions
Besides the military buildings, a sacrificial necropolis and civilian settlement is located within the walls. Items such as various daily tools, marble and bronze sculptures were found.

In 1983, Diana Fortress was added to the Archaeological Sites of Exceptional Importance list, protected by Republic of Serbia.

See also
 Archaeological Sites of Exceptional Importance

References

Moesia Superior
Roman fortifications in Serbia
Buildings of Justinian I
Archaeological Sites of Exceptional Importance